Anya Schiffrin (born December 6, 1962) is the director of the Technology, Media, and Communications (TMaC) specialization at Columbia University's School of International and Public Affairs (SIPA), and a lecturer at the School of International and Public Affairs.

Biography
Schiffrin is an American former business journalist. Previously, she freelanced and worked as an editor in Istanbul, a stringer for Reuters in Barcelona, a senior financial writer at The Industry Standard in New York, bureau chief for Dow Jones Newswires in Amsterdam and Hanoi, and a writer for many other publications. She was a former Knight-Bagehot academic fellow in business journalism at Columbia's Graduate School of Journalism. Schiffrin is an alumna of Reed College.

As well as her role in the School of International and Public Affairs, Schiffrin serves on a number of boards including the Open Society Foundation’s Program on Independent Journalism, Global Board and the advisory board of the Natural Resource Governance Institute (formerly named Revenue Watch Institute).

She writes on journalism and development as well as the media in Africa and the extractive sector, amongst other topics. Her most recent book is Global Muckraking: 100 Years of Investigative Reporting from Around the World (New Press 2014).

She is the daughter of the author and publisher André Schiffrin, and the sister in law of the lawyer Philippe Sands. She was married on October 29, 2004, to Nobel Prize-winning economist and author Joseph E. Stiglitz, who also teaches at Columbia University in New York City.

In 2011, her Reuters columns about the gender balance at Davos attracted international attention.

Books
Media in the Service of Power: Media Capture and the Threat to Democracy. (2017) (Editor)   
Global Muckraking: 100 Years of Investigative Journalism from Around the World (2014) (Editor) 
 From Cairo to Wall Street: Voices from the Global Spring (2012) (Co-editor with Eamon Kircher-Allen) 
 Bad News: How America's Business Press Missed the Story of the Century (2011) (Editor) 
 Covering Labor: A Reporter's Guide to Worker's Rights in a Global Economy (2006) (Co-editor with Liza Featherstone) 
 Covering Oil: A Reporter's Guide to Energy and Development (2005) (Co-editor with Svetlana Tsalik) 
 Business and Economic Reporting: Covering Companies, Financial Markets and the Broader Economy (2005) (Co-author with Margie Freaney and Jane M. Folpe)
 Covering Globalization: A Handbook for Reporters (2004) (Co-editor with Amer Bisat)

References

1962 births
Living people
American women journalists
Reed College alumni
Columbia University faculty
Journalism academics
Knight-Bagehot Fellows
American women academics
21st-century American women